Pityrodia viscida is a flowering plant in the mint family Lamiaceae and is endemic to the south-west of Western Australia. It is an erect shrub with sticky hairy stems, egg-shaped to narrowly elliptic leaves and white bell-like flowers.

Description
The upper surface of the leaves is glabrous and sticky, the lower surface covered with soft, yellowish-white hairs. The four stamens extend beyond the end of the tube, the lower pair longer than the upper two.

Taxonomy and naming
Pityrodia viscida was first formally described in 1918 by William Vincent Fitzgerald and the description was published in the Journal of the West Australian Natural History Society. The specific epithet (viscida) means "sticky", referring to the leaves and sepals.

Distribution
This pityrodia grows in sandy laterite, mainly between Mingenew and Three Springs in the Avon Wheatbelt and Geraldton Sandplains bioregions of south-western Western Australia.

Conservation
Pityrodia viscida is listed as "Priority Four" by the Government of Western Australia Department of Biodiversity, Conservation and Attractions, meaning that it is rare or near threatened.

References

viscida
Plants described in 1904
Flora of Western Australia
Taxa named by William Vincent Fitzgerald